The 1967 Kentucky Wildcats football team were an American football team that represented the University of Kentucky as a member of the Southeastern Conference during the 1967 NCAA University Division football season. In their sixth season under head coach Charlie Bradshaw, the team compiled a 2–8 record (1–6 in the SEC).

On September 30, Kentucky running back Nathaniel "Nate" Northington became the first African-American scholarship athlete to play in an Southeastern Conference game in the Wildcats' home game against Ole Miss. His debut was bittersweet as it came the day after the death of Greg Page, an African-American defensive end who had arrived at UK alongside Northington. Page died from complications of a paralyzing spinal cord injury suffered in an August 22 practice. Northington only played for three minutes before suffering a separated shoulder, and the Wildcats would lose 26–13.

Schedule

Footnotes

References

Kentucky
Kentucky Wildcats football seasons
Kentucky Wildcats football